Shalman (also Romanized as Shalmān and Shalimān; also known as Shalmānd) is a city in Kumeleh District, Langarud County, Gilan Province, Iran.  At the 2006 census, its population was 5,651, in 1,716 families. Shalman also spelled as Shilman or Shelman, which is known as Shalman Valley is also a big area near Peshawar District, in Khyber agency, Khyber Pakhtunkhwa province, Pakistan.

References

Populated places in Langarud County

Cities in Gilan Province